The 2000–01 NBA season was the Hawks' 52nd season in the National Basketball Association, and 33rd season in Atlanta. The Hawks received the sixth pick in the 2000 NBA draft, and selected DerMarr Johnson from the University of Cincinnati. In the off-season, the team signed free agent Matt Maloney, and re-signed Anthony Johnson after a brief stint with the Orlando Magic. Under new head coach Lon Kruger, the Hawks got off to a bad start losing their first seven games, but then posted a 7–7 record in December. In January, the team traded Johnson and Jim Jackson to the Cleveland Cavaliers in exchange for Brevin Knight.

At midseason, Dikembe Mutombo, who was selected for the 2001 NBA All-Star Game, was traded along with Roshown McLeod to the Philadelphia 76ers for Theo Ratliff, Toni Kukoč and Nazr Mohammed. However, Ratliff injured his wrist prior to the trade, and was out for the remainder of the season. Mutombo would later on be named Defensive Player of the Year with the Sixers, who went on to lose in five games to the Los Angeles Lakers in the NBA Finals. The Hawks continued to struggle losing ten straight games between February and March, as they finished seventh in the Central Division with a 25–57 record.

Second-year star Jason Terry showed improvement averaging 19.7 points, 4.9 assists and 1.3 steals per game, while Lorenzen Wright averaged 12.4 points and 7.5 rebounds per game, Alan Henderson provided the team with 10.5 points and 5.6 rebounds per game, and Knight contributed 6.9 points, 6.1 assists and 2.0 steals per game in 47 games with the team after the trade. Following the season, Wright and Knight were both traded to the Memphis Grizzlies.

Offseason

Draft picks

Roster

Roster Notes
 Center Theo Ratliff was acquired from the Philadelphia 76ers at midseason, but did not play with the Hawks this season due to a wrist injury.

Regular season

Season standings

z - clinched division title
y - clinched division title
x - clinched playoff spot

Record vs. opponents

Game log

Player statistics

Season

Awards and records
 Dikembe Mutombo, All-NBA Second Team

Transactions

References

See also
 2000-01 NBA season

Atlanta Hawks seasons
Atlanta Haw
Atlanta Haw
Atlanta Hawks